Chrysoscota cotriangulata is a moth of the family Erebidae first described by Jeremy Daniel Holloway in 2001. It is found on Borneo, Java and Sumatra. The habitat consists of lowlands and lower montane forests.

The length of the forewings is 10–11 mm.

References

Lithosiina
Moths described in 2001